Boedo is a station on Line E of the Buenos Aires Underground located at the intersection of San Juan and  Boedo avenues. The area is known for tango dance.

The station was opened on 16 December 1944 as a one station extension from General Urquiza. However, a temporary platform was in operation, and the current station was only opened on 9 December 1960. On 24 April 1966, the line was extended to Avenida La Plata.

References

External links

Buenos Aires Underground stations